Maladhar Basu (c. 15th century) was a Bengali poet. He wrote Sri Krishna Vijaya (শ্রীকৃষ্ণবিজয়, Triumph of Lord Krishna), the earliest Bengali narrative poem that can be assigned to a definite date. It is also the oldest Bengali narrative poem of Krishna legend. It was composed between 1473 and 1480.  The long poem is a translation of the 10th and 11th cantos of the Bhagavata Purana; a part of Vishnu Purana and the story of Ramayana is also incorporated here.

In the poem written in an early Bangla,  Maladhar focuses on Krishna's divine life, with the 10th canto relating the legends of Krishna as a child, and his divine play with the gopis in Vrindavana.  He was honoured by Rukunuddin Barbak Shah with the title 'Gunaraj Khan'.

Maladhar Basu was born at Kulingram village of modern-day Purba Bardhaman district, Paschimbanga (West Bengal) to Bhagirath Basu and Indumati Devi. Maladhar Basu was a scholar of Sanskrit literature and Vaishnava theology. He translated the famous Sanskrit work Bhagavata into Bengali language, under the patronage of Nusrat Shah, then ruler of Bengal.

References

Bengali male poets
Year of death unknown
15th-century Bengali poets
People from Purba Bardhaman district
Year of birth unknown
Poets from West Bengal
Bengal Sultanate officers
Bengali Hindus
Bengali-language poets
Bengali-language writers
Bengali writers